John Mitchels GAA is a Gaelic Athletic Association club based in Fews, County Waterford, Ireland. The club is exclusively dedicated to Gaelic Football Intermediate level.

The club has won the Waterford Senior Football Championship 3 times, 1970, 1973 and 1976.

Honours
Waterford Senior Football Championship: 3
 1970, 1973, 1976
Waterford Intermediate Football Championships: 2
 2003, 2007
Waterford Under-21 Football Championships: 1
 1969
Waterford Minor Football Championships 2
 1974, 1975 

Gaelic games clubs in County Waterford
Gaelic football clubs in County Waterford